Thirumeignanam Gnanaparameswarar Temple
() is a Hindu temple located at Thirumeignanam  in Thanjavur district, Tamil Nadu, India. The temple is dedicated to Shiva, as the moolavar presiding deity, in his manifestation as Gnanaparameswarar. His consort, Parvati, is known as Gnanambikai.
The place is also known as Tirunallur Mayaanam.

Significance 

It is one of the shrines of the 275 Paadal Petra Sthalams - Shiva Sthalams glorified in the early medieval Tevaram poems by Tamil Saivite Nayanar Tirugnanasambandar.

Literary mention 
Tirugnanasambandar describes the feature of the deity as:

References

External links 
 
 

Shiva temples in Thanjavur district
Padal Petra Stalam